The 1978 Cologne Cup, also known as the Cologne Grand Prix, was a men's tennis tournament played on indoor carpet courts in Cologne, West Germany that was part of the 1978 Colgate-Palmolive Grand Prix circuit. It was the third edition of the tournament and was held from 30 October through 5 November 1978. Fourth-seeded Wojciech Fibak won the singles title and the accompanying $10,000 first-prize money

Finals

Singles
 Wojciech Fibak defeated  Vijay Amritraj 6–2, 0-1, ret.
 It was Fibak's 1st singles title of the year and the 6th of his career.

Doubles
 Peter Fleming /  John McEnroe defeated  Bob Hewitt /  Frew McMillan 6–3, 6–2

References

External links
 ITF tournament edition details

Cologne Cup
Cologne Cup